Masters of the Sea (German: Herren der Meere) is a 1922 Austrian silent adventure film directed by Alexander Korda and starring Victor Varconi, María Corda and Tibor Lubinszky.

Production
It was the second film made by Korda for Austria's Sascha-Film company. It is based on the novel The Pirates by Ernest Vajda who also wrote the screenplay. Several other Hungarian exiles also worked on the film, including the producer Arnold Pressburger. The film's storyline offered a romantic view of modern-day pirates and their pursuit of treasure. Korda's actress wife Maria Corda appeared in a leading role, credited as Maria Palma.

Cast
 Victor Varconi 
 María Corda - Anny Lind (as Maria Palma)
 Tibor Lubinszky
 Gyula Szőreghy   
 Harry De Loon   
 Max Devrient   
 Reinhold Häussermann   
 Gert Lubbers   
 Paul Pranger      
 Albert Schreiber

References

Bibliography
 Kulik, Karol. Alexander Korda: The Man Who Could Work Miracles. Virgin Books, 1990.

External links

1922 films
Austrian silent feature films
Austrian adventure films
Films directed by Alexander Korda
Films based on Hungarian novels
Films produced by Arnold Pressburger
Pirate films
Austrian black-and-white films
1922 adventure films
Silent adventure films
1920s German-language films